Clive Baker may refer to:

 Clive Baker (footballer, born 1959), English football goalkeeper
 Clive Baker (footballer, born 1934) (1934–2012), English football forward